Cobley is a surname. Notable people with the surname include:

Arthur Cobley (1874–1960), British cricketer
David Cobley (born 1954), British painter
Donald Cobley (1928–1999), British modern pentathlete
John Cobley (1872–1958), Australian lawn bowler
Michael Cobley (born 1959), British science fiction writer

See also
 Tutnall and Cobley, a civil parish in England